Aechmea mollis is a plant species in the genus Aechmea. This species is endemic to the State of Bahia in eastern Brazil.

References

mollis
Plants described in 1970
Flora of Brazil